Luis Guadalupe Loroña Aguilar (born 21 June 1993) is a Mexican professional footballer who plays as a forward.

Honours
Mexico U23
CONCACAF Olympic Qualifying Championship: 2015

References

External links

Living people
1993 births
Association football forwards
Chiapas F.C. footballers
Querétaro F.C. footballers
Club Puebla players
Cimarrones de Sonora players
Correcaminos UAT footballers
Loros UdeC footballers
Atlético Zacatepec footballers
Liga MX players
Ascenso MX players
Liga Premier de México players
Footballers from Sonora
People from Caborca
Mexican footballers